Choketawee Promrut (born 16 March 1975) is a Thai football manager and former footballer, who is the current co-head coach with Surapong Kongthep of Thai League 1 club Port.

Choketawee was a member of Thailand players from 1997 until 2005, he also served as captain for Thailand in the 2004 AFC Asian Cup. In 2015, as head coach he led Thailand U23 to the 2015 Southeast Asian Games champions.

Managerial statistics

 A win or loss by the penalty shoot-out is counted as the draw in time.

Honours

Player
PEA FC
 Thailand Premier League 2008

Manager
Thailand U23
 SEA Games  Gold Medal: 2015

Udon Thani
Thai Regional League Division : North-East Champion: 2016

Port
Thai FA Cup: 2019

Individual
Thai League 1 Coach of the Month: September 2019

International goals

References

1975 births
Living people
Choketawee Promrut
Choketawee Promrut
2000 AFC Asian Cup players
2004 AFC Asian Cup players
Gombak United FC players
Tanjong Pagar United FC players
Tampines Rovers FC players
Singapore Premier League players
Choketawee Promrut
Association football sweepers
Association football midfielders
Choketawee Promrut
Choketawee Promrut
Southeast Asian Games medalists in football
Competitors at the 1995 Southeast Asian Games
Competitors at the 1997 Southeast Asian Games
Competitors at the 1999 Southeast Asian Games
Competitors at the 2013 Southeast Asian Games
Competitors at the 2015 Southeast Asian Games
Footballers at the 1994 Asian Games
Footballers at the 1998 Asian Games
Choketawee Promrut
Nakhon Si United F.C. managers